V-pop, an abbreviation for Vietnamese popular music, is a music genre covering Vietnamese pop music from the 1990s to the present day.

Etymology 
During the 1970s, V-pop was limited to Nhạc trẻ Sài Gòn (Youth music of Saigon, now called Ho Chi Minh City) or Kích động nhạc (Exciting music). After 1975, the name nhạc trẻ (youthful music), which encompasses vibrant, fun folk songs that were banned by the government at the time. But the development in line with Vietnamese pop music comes from Hanoi and Haiphong. The artists in these two places have been formally trained in the national conservatory school. In the 1990s, the phrase Nhạc nhẹ (Soft music) appeared when Vietnam was opening up to the world. Nhạc trẻ (Youth music) was used in the early 2000s. The phrase V-Pop was created by artists from the North, including Hanoi.

History

Domestic

Origins 

Vietnamese pop music was influenced early on by the large U.S. military presence in South Vietnam. Much of the music retained its traditional instruments, with the exception of war songs and war anthems. Vietnamese pop genre was not as renowned during the war, as most music would consist of patriotic music, war songs, or songs from the U.S.

On 30 April 1975, Saigon fell, and as a result, the Vietnam War ended and some South Vietnamese citizens evacuated to other countries. Popular music released up to that day (dubbed "yellow music") was then prohibited - specifically after July 2, 1976 - due to its sentimental and sympathetic nature. Music that was patriotic and followed a traditional revolutionary theme (dubbed "red music"), as well as folk songs, had "good values," and were encouraged by the then-newly re-unified Communist Vietnam. However, Vietnamese classics (dubbed "Nhạc trẻ") continued to survive in overseas Vietnamese communities, where it remained even after being reintroduced back to Vietnam in 1986.

In 1986, after the Đổi Mới reformations, Vietnamese pop music made a gradual recovery. The music at that time, mainly produced by Trịnh Công Sơn, continued the traditional "love and war" theme. This historical genre gradually lost favor by the early 1990s, around the time the Soviet Union had collapsed.

1990s and 2000s 

By 1995, multiple restrictions were being lifted and diplomatic relations with Western-aligned countries improved. V-pop returned to a more steady path compared to its tumultuous period during and prior to the Vietnam War. In 1997, the Làn Sóng Xanh ("Wave of Green") Awards were founded to push the development of the music industry. Singer Lam Trường produced "Tình Thôi Xót Xa" in 1998  and was popular amongst the young people of Ho Chi Minh City, which marked a strong beginning for Vietnam's domestic music market.

At the beginning of the 21st century, popular artists (such as Hồng Nhung, Thu Phương, Hồ Quỳnh Hương, Mỹ Tâm, Mỹ Linh, Thanh Lam, Phương Thanh, Đan Trường, Thanh Thảo) emerged, creating musical hits that were characteristically light, vibrant, and youthful. Singers such as Bảo Thy, Khoi My, Tóc Tiên, Hương Tràm, Soobin Hoàng Sơn, Son Tung M-TP, and Noo Phước Thịnh further popularised R&B tunes.

Numerous artists, such as Bằng Kiều, Hồ Quỳnh Hương, Mỹ Linh, Hồng Nhung, Phương Thanh, Mỹ Tâm, and Đan Trường emerged from Vietnam and started to produce EDM, pop music, R&B, rap, ballad, and other genres. During this period of cultural expansion, a number of foreign artists had worked with the emerging industry (4Men, Super Junior, Lee Young Ah). Also emerging were a large number of modern music acts such as Anh Khang, Tạ Quang Thắng, Bảo Thy, Đông Nhi, Noo Phước Thịnh, Quang Vinh, whom of which were all associated with the R&B genre.

The Asia Song Festival (Festival of Asian music) created many opportunities for cultural exchange between countries. Artists representing Vietnam included Mỹ Tâm (2003), Mỹ Linh (2004), Hồ Quỳnh Hương (2006 & 2008), Lam Trường (2007) and Hồ Ngọc Hà (2009). Many of these Vietnamese artists hope to fortify the entertainment industry by engaging in festivals, shows, etc., in other countries.

2010s and 2020s 
During this period, a new wave of young artists, such as MIN, Amee, Erik, and Sơn Tùng M-TP (Sơn Tùng M-TP is considered King of V-Pop), started to develop in this era. Vietnamese music competitions also played a role in shaping a new wave of Vietnamese artists such as Vietnam Idol, The Voice (Vietnam), Vietnamese Stars, and Star Academy (Vietnam). Thanh Bui, an Overseas Vietnamese (Australian-born Vietnamese singer), also participated in Australian Idol. In 2018, SGO48, a Vietnamese sister group of Japanese AKB48, was released but has had mixed success since debuting.

Overseas 
After the fall of Saigon, some artists emigrated. A growing demand for music until 30 April 1975 lead to a re-emergence of the popularity of these previously-available songs, which were no longer widely available in Vietnam.

In the early 1980s, the number of foreign record companies specializing in Vietnamese music began to grow. Thúy Nga Centre, Van Son Entertainment, and Asia Entertainment were all companies that have produced many popular Vietnamese songs, as well as entertainment concert series like Paris By Night, the Van Son Show, Asia, and multiple others.

Around the 1990s, more young artists began to appear overseas in the international market. These included Lâm Nhật Tiến, Trish Thuy Trang, Tuấn Ngọc, Bằng Kiều, and Minh Tuyết. During the 2000s and 2010s, K-pop and J-pop had already started to spread to the Western world. K-pop had spread to South East Asia and was influential for Vietnamese entertainment. Vietnamese pop music began include more traits seen in such MVs, such as flashy visuals and fashion, which was a departure from melodic ballads that Vietnamese audiences were more accustomed to. EDM was also incorporated into Vietnamese songs. Nevertheless, boléro, ballad, R&B, rock etc. still remains popular.

Currently, YouTube is the main video-sharing platform. Many MVs have started to trend on YouTube in Western countries in the late 2010s and early 2020s. However, sad, melodic ballad songs, such as historical war songs, war movie soundtracks, pre-1975 South Vietnamese pop songs, or musical shows such as Paris by Night, are also still popular amongst Overseas Vietnamese.

Internationally 

At the end of 2005, singer Mỹ Tâm released the album Void. In mid-September 2007, Mỹ Linh re-released her three old albums for domestic and international markets, including Made in Vietnam (2003), Chat with Mozart (2005) and Let Love Sing (2006) with the help of Pony Canyon Records (Japan). Made in Vietnam was renamed Radio-I in Japan and was awarded the best album of the month in Nagoya, Aichi City. At the end of 2006, My Tam made her fifth album, "Soaring", in Korea and released her album in collaboration with Nurimaru Pictures. Her 9th studio album, Tâm 9, became the first Vietnamese artist's album to enter the Billboard World Album chart at №10.

In recent years, V-pop has started to attract more attention internationally from young singers with innovative new music styles such as Trúc Nhân, min, Amee, Hoàng Thùy Linh, and MONSTAR. Many songs and albums from the V-pop genre have entered numerous prestigious international music charts. V-pop has gradually become a leader in the Southeast Asian music industry.

Currently, the most viewed music video that can arguably be classified as V-pop is a children's song called "Bong Bong Bang Bang" (365daband), reaching more than 510 million views.
 
In 2019, Son Tung M-TP collaborated with the rapper Snoop Dogg to release the song "Give It to Me". The Source called him an "Asian Sensation" and World Music Awards dubbed him a "king of Vpop". Korea's Star News also posted the article and called him a leading voice within the V-pop music industry. In 2020, Tung entered the Billboard Social 50 chart at No.28, becoming the first Vietnamese artist to enter the chart. In 2021, Tung entered the Billboard Social 50 chart at No.28, becoming the first Vietnamese artist to enter the chart. In 2020, the song "Give It to Me" featuring Snoop Dogg entered the Billboard LyricFind Global chart at No.1. In 2021, the song "Chúng ta của hiện tại" entered the Billboard LyricFind Global chart at No.1. and the song "Muộn rồi mà sao còn" entered the Billboard Global Excl. U.S. at number 126.
 
In 2020, during the COVID-19 pandemic, Min and Erik released a song called "Ghen Cô Vy" (Jealous Coronavirus) to encourage people on how to handle the pandemic. The song has become popular for its catchy tunes and for raising awareness about limiting the spread of COVID-19.

See also 
 Popular music of Vietnam
 Ca trù
 Quan họ
 Nhã nhạc
 Nhạc tài tử
 Traditional Vietnamese dance
 Traditional Vietnamese musical instruments
 Vietnamese theatre

References 

Vietnamese music
Pop music by country